6 meter may refer to:

 6-meter band, an amateur radio band
 6 Metre, a type of sailboat